Fiorano al Serio is a comune (municipality) in the Province of Bergamo in the Italian region of Lombardy, located about  northeast of Milan and about  northeast of Bergamo.  

Fiorano al Serio borders the following municipalities: Casnigo, Cene, Gazzaniga, Vertova.

References